The WNBA Basketball Executive of the Year Award is an annual Women's National Basketball Association (WNBA) award first presented after the league's 2017 regular season. The winner is selected at the end of the regular season by a panel consisting of one executive from each of the WNBA's 12 teams, each of whom casts a vote for first, second and third place. Panel members are not allowed to vote for themselves. Each first-place vote is worth five points; each second-place vote is worth three points; and each third-place vote is worth one point. The person with the highest point total, regardless of the number of first-place votes, wins the award.

Winners

See also

 List of sports awards honoring women

References

Executive
Awards established in 2017